USCGC Point Hannon (WPB-82355) was an  Point class cutter constructed in 1967 for use as a law enforcement and search and rescue patrol boat.

Design and construction details

Construction and design details
Point Hannon was built to accommodate an 8-man crew. She was powered by two  VT600 Cummins diesel main drive engines and had two five-bladed  propellers. The main drive engines were later replaced by  VT800 Cummins engines. Engine exhaust was ported through the transom rather than through a conventional stack permitting a 360 degree view from the bridge a useful feature in search and rescue work.

She had a steel hull, an aluminum superstructure with a longitudinally framed construction to save weight. Controls were located on the bridge which allowed one-man operation and eliminated an engineer watch in the engine room. For short periods, a crew of four men could operate the cutter, however, the need for rest brought the practical crew to eight for normal service. The screws were designed for ease of replacement and could be changed without removing the cutter from the water. A clutch-in idle speed of three knots helped to conserve fuel on lengthy patrols and she had an eighteen knot maximum speed.

Interior access was through a watertight door on the starboard side aft of the deckhouse, which contained the cabin for the officer-in-charge and the executive officer,  a small arms locker, scuttlebutt, desk and head. Access to the lower deck and engine room was via a ladder, at the bottom of which was the galley, mess and recreation deck. A watertight door at the front of the mess bulkhead led to the crew quarters which was ten feet long with six stowable bunks, three on each side. Forward of the bunks was the crew's head with sink, shower and commode, interior spaces were air-conditioned.

History
Point Hannon was stationed at West Jonesport, ME from 1967 to January 
2001. She was used for law enforcement and search and rescue operations. On 12 July 1967, while towing F/V Stanley Butler, the tow was hit by F/V Hope II in Great Round Shoals Canal. The cutter commenced a tandem tow until relieved by cutter Cape Horn. On 22 October 1967, she helped fight fire on the Indian M/V Vishva Mangal near Searsport, ME. On 13 December 1978, she seized the Panamanian tug Tuskewr, which was attempting to smuggle hashish worth about $1 million into the US. On 15 January 1984, she rescued a man clinging to a buoy 12 miles off Rockland, Maine.

Point Hannon was transferred to the Naval Force of Panama in 2001 and renamed P-209 "5 de Noviembre" Since then the ship has played in various missions along the territorial waters of the Republic of Panama as part of the naval fleet, under the aegis of the National Directorate of Operations, Naval Group. Panama has 5 ships of this type.

References

Bibliography
This article includes material from the public domain source [www.uscg.mil/history/webcutters/Point_Hannon.pdf US Coast Guard]

Fuerzas Armadas de Panamá

Hannon
1967 ships
Ships built in Tacoma, Washington
Point-class cutters of the Panamanian Public Forces